The world glyph sets are character repertoires comprising a subset of Unicode characters. Their purpose is to provide an implementation guideline for producers of fonts for the representation of natural languages. Unlike Windows Glyph List 4 (WGL) it is specified by font foundries and not by operating system manufacturers. It is, however, very similar in glyph coverage to WGL4, but neither contains all the characters of the other.

Digital fonts for the European and American market have traditionally often been sold in a standard ("Std") package for western languages and additional separate files to cover central ("CE"), eastern ("Baltic") and southern ("Turk") European languages in the Roman script and sometimes also packages to support for the Greek (monotonic) and Cyrillic scripts. With the advent of the OpenType format, which supports Unicode, all characters could be included in a single font file. Some font foundries continue to sell packages with differing glyph coverage where the basic one hardly covers more than Windows-1252. They introduced certain variants like Professional ("Pro") which supports all major languages written with Latin letters, Commercial ("Com") for international communication in office use, such as those covering Linotype Extended European Characterset (LEEC) or, adding Greek and Cyrillic, WGL or world glyph sets.

The set is used in several font families by Linotype and Monotype such as Neue Frutiger W1G.

Character table

See also 
 Adobe Glyph List

References 

Digital typography
Character encoding